"Sunday in the South" is a song written by Jay Booker, and recorded by American country music group Shenandoah. It was released in May 1989 as the third single from their album The Road Not Taken.  It was their second number-one hit in both the United States and Canada.

Content
The song is a recollection of sacred Sundays, namely in the Southern United States.

Music video
The music video was directed by Larry Boothby and premiered in mid-1989. It was shot on the grounds of the Colbert County Courthouse in Tuscumbia, Alabama. The storyline roughly follows those of the lyrics, with the band performing at a community potluck, as the backdrop for children's games, checkers and more.

Chart performance

Year-end charts

References

1989 singles
Shenandoah (band) songs
Columbia Records singles
1989 songs